Daniel Stephan (born 3 August 1973) is a retired German handball player.

Born in Rheinhausen, he was a member of the German national handball team from 1995, winning the 2004 European Men's Handball Championship. He retired in 2005, after an injury series not wanting to end, which had let him never take part at a World Men's Handball Championship. Stephan was the World Player of the Year 1998 and the German handball player of the years 1997 to 1999.

In the Bundesliga Stephan played for OSC Rheinhausen until 1994, when he changed to TBV Lemgo where he played until 2008. With Lemgo, he has won the National Cup of Germany in 1995, 1997 and 2002, the National Championship of Germany in 1997 and 2003, the EHF Cup in 2006 as well as the EHF Cup Winner's Cup in 1996.

References

1973 births
Living people
Sportspeople from Duisburg
German male handball players
Olympic handball players of Germany
Handball players at the 1996 Summer Olympics
Handball players at the 2000 Summer Olympics
Handball players at the 2004 Summer Olympics
Olympic silver medalists for Germany
Olympic medalists in handball
Medalists at the 2004 Summer Olympics
21st-century German people